The Main Himalayan Thrust (MHT) is a décollement under the Himalaya Range. This thrust fault follows a NW-SE strike, reminiscent of an arc, and gently dip towards the north, beneath the region. It is the largest active continental megathrust fault in the world.

Overview 
The MHT accommodates crustal shortening of India and Eurasia as a result of the ongoing collision between the Indian and Eurasian plates. Deformation of the crust is also accommodated along splay structures including the Main Frontal Thrust (MFT), Main Boundary Thrust (MBT),  Main Central Thrust (MCT) and possibly the South Tibetan Detachment. The MHT is the root detachment of these splays. At this present moment, the MFT and MHT accounts for almost the entire rate of convergence (15-21 mm/yr). This fault defines where the India subcontinent is underthrust beneath the Himalayan orogenic wedge.

In April 2015, a section of the MHT produced a blind rupture earthquake, killing nearly 9,000 Nepalese.

Associated seismicity 
The Main Himalayan Thrust and its splay branches has been the source of numerous earthquakes, including some that are indirectly related.

See also
Geology of the Himalaya

References 

Tectonics
Himalayas
Active faults
Structural geology
Seismic faults
Seismic faults of Asia
Thrust faults
Seismic faults of Pakistan
Geology of the Himalaya
Subduction zones
Geology of Nepal
Geology of Asia
Geology of India
Geology of Pakistan
Geology of China
Geology of Bhutan